The Ferrari 268/282C/308C engine is a twin-turbocharged, 2.6-liter, 2.8-liter, and 3.0-liter, V-8 racing engine, designed, developed and built by Ferrari, for their sister company Lancia, to use in their Lancia LC2 Group C sports prototype race car; between 1983 and 1986. The engine itself is derived from the Dino engine.

Design
Besides the fact that the LC1 had an open-cockpit, the turbocharged straight-four Lancia engine it had used was not capable of achieving the fuel economy necessary in the new Group C regulations, requiring Lancia to also seek a new powerplant.  Under the direction of Cesare Fiorio, Lancia began to work on the LC1's replacement.
Lancia lacked a production engine large enough to base a racing engine on, leaving the company to turn to outside sources.  Since Lancia were owned by the Fiat Group, they were able to seek the assistance of fellow Fiat company Ferrari.  Ferrari allowed Lancia to adapt the new naturally aspirated  four valve V8 which had been introduced in the Ferrari 308 GTBi QV in 1982.  The development of the engine was assigned by Enzo Ferrari to Nicola Materazzi, then Chief Engineer in the Racing Department. The development was done in parallel with that of the F114B powering the GTO and both engines were intended with high duty in mind, with one difference being that the GTO engine would use IHI turbos for the road.

The specific engine displacement was chosen because of the possibility of using the same engine in the North American CART series. The engine was initially connected to a Hewland five-speed manual gearbox, which was replaced by an Abarth-cased unit in 1984.

The Ferrari V8 was modified in 1984, bringing the displacement back up to 3.0-litres in an attempt to increase reliability and horsepower while improved engine electronics from Magneti Marelli allowed the larger engine to use the same amount of fuel as the previous version. The engine developed just under 840 HP at 9000 rpm with massive 800 lb.-ft. at 4800 rpm, the twin KKK turbos were running at 3.0 bar boost and would start pulling from 3000 rpm.  In total, seven LC2s were built under the direction of Lancia, while a further two were built for Gianni Mussato without official backing after the program had ended.

After the program had ended, Abarth acquired an LC2 and fitted it with the 3.5-litre Alfa Romeo Tipo 1035 V10 engine from the Alfa Romeo 164 Procar, and developed it under the project name SE047.  The SE047 was an early development of the Alfa Romeo SE 048SP project in 1988.  The SE047's engine was ultimately not utilized in the later stages of the SE 048SP development.

Applications
Lancia LC2

References

Engines by model
Gasoline engines by model
Ferrari
Group C
V8 engines
Alfa Romeo in motorsport
Ferrari in motorsport
Ferrari engines